Devil Beside You is a 2005 Taiwanese drama starring Mike He, Rainie Yang and Kingone Wang. It is based on the Japanese manga Akuma de Sourou, written by Mitsuba Takanashi. It was produced by Comic Ritz International Production (可米瑞智國際藝能有限公司) with Chai Zhi Ping (柴智屏) as producer and directed by Lin He Long (林合隆). The series was first broadcast in Taiwan on free-to-air China Television (CTV) (中視) from 26 June to 18 September 2005 and cable TV Eastern Television (ETTV) (東森) for 20 episodes.

Synopsis
The story begins with Qi Yue (Rainie Yang) planning to confess her feelings to the basketball team captain, Yuan Yi (Kingone Wang). She wrote a love letter and plans to pass it to him. Being as careless as only she can be, she has made her confession to the wrong person, who happened to be the school's devil, Ah Meng, who is her junior and a first-year student in school. She is so shocked and embarrassed to see Jiang Meng aka Ah Mon's (Mike He) face that she drops her love letter in front of Ah Mon and runs away. Ah Mon picks up the letter.

Ah Mon is amused by the whole thing and decides to have some fun with Qi Yue. He threatens Qi Yue to print a thousand copies of her love letter and let the whole school know of her feelings for Yuan Yi. In order to stop Ah Mon, Qi Yue agrees to be his "runner", someone who does his errands/bidding. 

With Ah Mon's continuous bullying of Qi Yue, she is driven to stop all the nonsense by confessing her feelings to Yuan Yi again. In this way, she will not be afraid of Ah Mon's disclosing the love letter anymore. To Qi Yue's surprise, Yuan Yi has similar feelings for her.

While Qi Yue assumes that the whole ordeal with the devil is going to end, she receives another piece of bad news—her mom is going to marry the school's chairman who is also Ah Mon's father, making Ah Mon her stepbrother.

Qi Yue's love letter is put up on the school notice board, and she misunderstands that it is Ah Mon who did it. She confronts him and storms off. After realizing that she has misunderstood Ah Mon, she apologizes to Ah Mon and pleads him to hit her so that she feels better—Ah Mon kisses her instead. Yuan Yi happens to see them kissing and confronts their relationship. Ah Mon yells at Yuan Yi, saying that he wants Qi Yue. After Yuan Yi runs away in anger, Qi Yue looks at Ah Mon and begins to sob. After Qi Yue walks away in tears, Ah Mon feels guilty.

Yuan Yi regrets not believing in Qi Yue and returns to her, asking her out on a date. Qi Yue agrees happily. On their first date, they met Ah Mon again. Qi Yue and Ah Mon have some misunderstandings, and they go separate ways.

After the date, Qi Yue went home. After she took her bath, she fainted and was saved by Ah Mon's father. He brings her to his house to take care of her while her mom is away on a trip. Ah Mon and Qi Yue meet again at his house. She knows from Yuan Yi that she misunderstood Ah Mon again. Seeing Ah Mon had injured his hand, Qi Yue offers to clean the wounds for him. Sitting on Ah Mon's bed and putting medicine on his hand, she realizes Ah Mon is staring at her intensely, and this makes her heart pound. Qi Yue wakes up and finds herself sleeping on Ah Mon's bed. Apparently, both have fallen asleep and Ah Mon's father has carried her to his bed.

Qi Yue finally realizes that the person she likes is Ah Mon. She tells Yuan Yi the truth and walks away. In the evening, she sits alone at the playground, crying softly to herself for hurting Yuan Yi. Ah Mon finds her and comforts her. She takes a ride on Ah Mon's bicycle. They had a minor accident, and both fell on the road, unharmed. Qi Yue asks Ah Mon why is it always so dangerous to be with him. Ah Mon replies to her that he cannot stop the dangers, but he will protect her. Ah Mon kisses Qi Yue passionately on the road.

Due to their relationship as future step siblings, they keep their romantic relationship in the dark. Except for some close friends of Ah Mon & Qi Yue, nobody knows of their relationship.

Ah Mon's buddy, Yang Ping, who is in love with Li Xiang, is unhappy to see Ah Mon and Qi Yue together. He wants to get rid of Qi Yue so that Ah Mon can be with Li Xiang. At the school's rooftop, he ambushes Qi Yue and wants to kill her. Li Xiang hesitantly tells Ah Mon of Yang Ping's plan and Ah Mon rushes to Qi Yue's rescue. He beats up Yang Ping and brings Qi Yue home. At home, Qi Yue confesses her liking to Ah Mon, and he hugs her, saying that he is happy to know she likes him.

One fine day, a sweet-looking boy comes to Qi Yue and confesses his feelings towards her. This shocks Qi Yue and her whole class as he storms into her class and tells her that he likes her and wants her to convey a message to her boyfriend that he wants Qi Yue for himself. His name is Ah Rang.

Yuan Yi casually mentions this to Ah Mon, and he storms away in anger. In the evening, he tells Qi Yue that nobody is more confident than he is in liking her, and she belongs to him only. Qi Yue smiles at his possessiveness.

Qi Yue goes to Da Zhi High School to look for Ah Rang and realizes that he is Ah Mon's younger brother. Yuan Yi tells Ah Mon about this, and Ah Mon storms off to look for Qi Yue. At seeing Ah Rang and Qi Yue, he trips Ah Rang and makes him fall to the ground. Ah Mon grabs Qi Yue's arm and walks away. He does not want to talk about his brother at all. Ah Rang is actually harmless, and his only intention is to attract Ah Mon's attention. He longs for his brother's affection. While arguing with Ah Mon, Ah Rang suffers an asthma attack and Ah Mon rushes him to the hospital. Both brothers patch up. Ah Mon was then told Qi Yue fainted in the hospital. Ah Mon runs to her. At her home, Ah Mon reprimands Qi Yue for being a busybody and tiring herself out, which is the cause of her fatigue. He is concerned about her, which makes Qi Yue happy.

Ah Mon's relationship with Ah Rang is better, so when Ah Rang gets bullied, Ah Mon comes to his rescue. Ah Mon threatens the bullies and they run away because they were outnumbered as Ah Mon brought along his group of friends. Later, the bullies come after Ah Rang, but Ah Mon takes them all on without Ah Rang's knowledge. Ah Mon defeats them all with ease, but then the bullies use a car to hit him. This causes Ah Mon to get hurt, and it affects his basketball skills on the court.

Ah Mon's grandmother suspects that Ah Mon and Qi Yue are seeing each other. She plans to arrange Ah Mon with a rich girl, Mei Di, which Qi Yue makes feel sad and uncertain. At the same time, Qi Yue's first love reappears as her school lecturer (Ah Sen). This causes Ah Mon to be jealous, and he feels insecure. Ah Mon rejects Mei Di and she left wishing Qi Yue and him happiness. Similarly, Qi Yue tells Ah Sen that she likes Ah Mon, and he goes back to his girlfriend.

Following that adventure, Ah Mon and Qi Yue take advantage of their parents' out of town trip to travel to see Qi Yue's father's grave. They get caught in a rainstorm and discover that the train is not running. Ah Mon gets a hotel room, but Qi Yue can't stand the tension and makes the trip back home to find her mother waiting for her. She finally confesses that she and Ah Mon are a couple. Since this is going to be a problem for the family, her mother decides that they will have to move out of the house. However, when she faints, they find out that she's pregnant. Though it isn't proper, they decide that they will support Ah Mon and Qi Yue's relationship and continue their own.

While things seem to be going fine again, Ah Mon's mom comes back and wants Ah Mon to follow her to Italy. At playground, Ah Mon tells Qi Yue that she can continue to date other people while he is away, but he will always only like her. They attend their parents' wedding a few days afterward. Ah Mon tells Qi Yue that he will definitely come back to her. And she decides to wait for him.

Later that year, at Christmastime, Qi Yue goes out to get a part for the Christmas Tree that Ah Mon gave her the previous year. While she is out, she's grabbed off the street and blindfolded, thrown in the trunk of a car and taken to another location. It is a prank, orchestrated by Ah Mon's friends. When she takes off her blindfold, Ah Mon is standing in front of her. He tells Qi Yue that he's back, and they kiss.

Characters

Major characters

Minor characters

Multimedia

Music
 Opening Theme: "臭男人" Chou Nan Ren (Jerk) by Huang Yida
 Ending Theme: "曖昧" Ai Mei (Ambiguous) by Rainie Yang

Insert songs
 "月亮代表我的心" Yue Liang Dai Biao Wo De Xin (The Moon Represents My Heart) - David Tao
 "Set Me Free" - Huang Yida
 "一秒的安慰" Yi Miao De An Wei (A Moment's Consolation) - Huang Yida
 "理想情人" Li Xiang Qing Ren (Ideal Lover) - Rainie Yang
 "An Rao Siao" - XL
 "Mei Li De Hway Yi" (Chorus Version) - XL

Books

Remake
It was remade in Indonesia as Benar Benar Cinta.

References

External links
  CTV Devil Beside You official homepage
  ETTV Devil Beside You official homepage

China Television original programming
Eastern Television original programming
2005 Taiwanese television series debuts
2005 Taiwanese television series endings
Taiwanese television dramas based on manga